Octavio Vázquez Rodríguez (born September 10, 1972) is a Galician-American New York-based composer of classical music.

Biography

Born in Santiago de Compostela (Galicia, Spain), Vázquez spontaneously started writing music at age 7. Not knowing how to notate music at that age, he created his own system. At age 12 he became music director at St. Peter's church in Lugo.  In 1989 he moved to Madrid, where he studied at the Adolfo Salazar Conservatory and the Madrid Royal Conservatory, taking degrees in piano, collaborative piano, and theory. While in Madrid he also worked as assistant conductor to Oscar Gershensohn and pursued graduate studies in conducting and musicology. After winning the prestigious Barrié de la Maza Foundation Scholarship, he went on to study composition at the Peabody Institute in Baltimore, and afterwards obtained his doctorate from the University of Maryland, College Park, where he was on a full Fellowship. Since 1999 he resides in New York City.

He is primarily interested in the "...emotional impact [of his music] and direct communication with the listener".  His music has been described as "...a burning torch for the next century" by Mark Greenfest, of the New Music Connoisseur, and noted for its neo-romantic qualities, as well as its tonal, polytonal and atonal instances. Well known for his contrapuntal technique and use of classical and romantic forms, his doctoral dissertation piece "Hermes" exemplifies the post-modern attributes of his music, amalgamating formal structures of prelude and fugue, theme and variations, and sonata form, while thematically all the material is derived from a 5-note chord, first presented as Ab-C-D#-E-G. Another significant aspect of Vázquez's music is its reflection of his Galician identity. A notable example is "Widows of the Living and of the Dead" (2014), a concerto for gaita (Galician bagpipe) and orchestra. Commissioned by Cristina Pato with support from New Music USA, the piece is "an ode to Galicia’s history of women upholding Galician society" following the massive emigration suffered during most of the 19th and 20th centuries, and "dedicated to all women throughout history".

Collaborators include musicians such as Rossen Milanov, Eric Jacobsen, Víctor Pablo Pérez, Dmitri Berlinsky, Ilya and Leonid Finkelshteyn, Johnny Gandelsman, Daniel Gaisford, Eldar Nebolsin, Gintaras Janusevicius, the Flatiron Trio, the Monument Piano Trio, the Verdehr Trio, the Poulenc Trio, Viacheslav Dinerchtein, Julian Gargiulo, and Grammy Award winner Cristina Pato, and artists such as Olivia Kim, Luis Alvarez Roure, and photographer Katya Chilingiri.

Dr. Vázquez teaches at Nazareth College (New York) , where he directs the Composition Program.

List of works

Orchestral
Memento  (1998), winner of the Andres Gaos International Competition, premiered by the Royal Philharmonic Orchestra of Galicia
Lethe (1999), based on the "Guernica" Piano Trio, premiered by Carlos Kalmar and the Galicia Symphony Orchestra
Hermes (2004), commissioned and premiered by the Royal Philharmonic Orchestra of Galicia and conductor Maximino Zumalave
Styx (2005), commissioned and premiered by the Galicia Symphony Orchestra and conductor Hansjörg Schellenberger
Piano Concerto (2007), commissioned and premiered by the Galicia Symphony Orchestra, with soloist Cristina Pato
Eleusis (2009), commissioned by AEOS and Fundación Autor and premiered by the RTVE Symphony Orchestra conducted by Adrian Leaper
Tropos, Violin Concerto (2010), commissioned by the Xacobeo Classics Festival 2010 and premiered by the Royal Philharmonic Orchestra of Galicia, with soloist Amaury Coeytaux
Ewiges blaues Licht (2011), commissioned and premiered by the Galicia Symphony Orchestra and conductor Víctor Pablo Pérez
Ewiges Licht II (2013), a major revision of the former, commissioned and premiered by the Real Filharmonia de Galicia and conductor Paul Daniel
Penelope (2014), for choir and orchestra, commissioned by the Galician Cultural Council and premiered by Solo Voces, Collegium Compostellanum, and the Real Filharmonia de Galicia conducted by Maximino Zumalave
Elas (2014), for Galician gaita and orchestra, commissioned by Cristina Pato and New Music USA and premiered by Cristina Pato and the Sphinx Symphony Orchestra conducted by Andrew Grams
Widows of the Living and of the Dead (2014), for Galician gaita and orchestra, commissioned by Cristina Pato and New Music USA and premiered by Cristina Pato and the Real Filharmonia de Galicia conducted by Paul Daniel
Gaude (2016), for choir and baroque orchestra, commissioned by Stefan Plewniak & Il Giardino d’Amore
Magnificat (2020), for soprano, organ, choir and orchestra, commissioned by the Church of St. Thomas the Apostle of West Hartford, CT with support from the Marjorie Jolidon Fund of the Greater Hartford chapter of the American Guild of Organists
Migrant (2021), for violin and string orchestra, commissioned by the Society for New Music with support from the National Endowment for the Arts
Māyā (Illusions) (2022), commissioned by the Royal Philharmonic Orchestra of Galicia

Chamber
Sonata for Violin and Piano No. 1 (1990)
Sonata for Viola and Piano No. 1 (1992)
Sonata for Violin and Piano No. 2 (1993)
Trio for Clarinet, Cello and Piano (1994)
Suite for Bassoon and Piano (1996)
Septet (1996)
String Quartet No. 3 (1997), premiered at Merkin Hall
Sonata for Viola and Piano No. 2 (2002), diploma at the Prokofiev International Competition, premiered at Carnegie Hall in 2003
Galician Folk Dances (2003), for violin and piano, commissioned by the COAHSI
Trio for Flute, Viola and Cello (2003), premiered at Carnegie Hall in 2003
Trio for Violin, Cello and Piano, 'Guernica''' (1999, 2006) commissioned by the Guernica Project Inc. and premiered by the Flatiron TrioSonata for Clarinet and Piano (2009), commissioned and premiered by Enrique Pérez Piquer and the Via Stellae Festival 2010MusicScapes (2011), commissioned by Katya ChilingiriBalkanika (2011), commissioned with support from the Secretary of Culture of SpainNGC 6611 (2012), Honorable Mention in Hilary Hahn's "In 27 Pieces: The Hilary Hahn Encores' Contest"Trio for Oboe, Bassoon and Piano (2012), commissioned and premiered by the Poulenc Trio with support from New Music USATrio for Violin, Clarinet and Piano (2012), commissioned and premiered by the Verdehr Trio and Michigan State UniversityThree Departures for alto sax and piano (2016), commissioned by the New York chapter of the Music Teachers National AssociationSonata for Alto Saxophone and Piano (2016)Pentagrammon for wind quintet (2016), commissioned and premiered by the Airas Ensemble with support from Nazareth College (New York)Winterzug for horn, tuba and piano (2016), commissioned and premiered by the Eastern Standard TrioWhat A Circus for horn, tuba and piano (2017), commissioned by the Eastern Standard Trio with support from the Meir Rimon Commissioning Assistance Program of the International Horn SocietyAlchemical Birds for reed quintet (2018), commissioned by the I-Park Foundation 2018 Composers + Musicians Collaborative Residency for the Akropolis Reed QuintetFierce for cello and piano (2018), commissioned by Tribeca New MusicMeus Benqueridos Irmáns / My Beloved Brethren for violin, gaita and piano (2019), commissioned by Cristina Pato.Piano Quintet (2021), commissioned by the Aspen Music Festival for the American String Quartet

SoloSonatina for Piano (1994)Prelude and Fugue for Guitar (1999)Nineteen Preludes for Piano (2001)Galician Folk Dances for piano (2003)Variations on a Theme by Mozart for violin (2008)Nostos for Guitar (2009), commissioned by Adam Levin and the Fulbright CommissionPercée for Violin (2011), commissioned by Roberto Alonso TrilloDouble I for Violin (2015), commissioned by Roberto Alonso TrilloThree Galician Pieces for piano (2015), first prize in the Galician Folk Songs international competitionGalician Fancy for piano (2019), written for pianist and activist Isabel Perez Dobarro

VocalThree Cantigas (1994), to poems by Airas Nunes, Garcia de Andrade, Eanes de CotomSemente for Mixed Choir (1995), poem by Emilio Pita (from Jacobusland)  But a Breath for Mixed Choir (1995), first prize in the Kromatika International CompetitionTempestad, Amanece, for voice and piano trio (2002), poems by Ilia GalánLieder to Poems by Goethe, for bass, bass clarinet and piano (2005)Lieder to Poems by Rosalía de Castro, for voice and piano (2013)Penelope (2014), for choir and orchestra, commissioned by the Galician Cultural Council and premiered by Solo Voces, Collegium Compostellanum, and the Real Filharmonia de Galicia conducted by Maximino ZumalaveTwo Songs to Poems by Neira Vilas, for voice and piano (2015) Gaude (2016), for choir and baroque orchestra, commissioned by Stefan Plewniak & Il Giardino d’AmoreAbout Light (2019), for choir, commissioned, premiered and recorded by Cantabile Choir

Recordings
 Widows of the Living and of the Dead, Cristina Pato, Paul Daniel, Royal Galician Philharmonic, 2021 ODRADEK
 Zeitgesit, Verdehr Trio, 2021 Blue Griffin
 Alchemical Birds, Akropolis Reed Quintet, Birds EP, 2020 AKROPOLIS
 Nostos, Adam Levin, NAXOS
 Galician Folk Dances, Three Galician Pieces, Javier Otero Neira, Landra Music
 Songs to Poems by Rosalia, Joaquin Pixan, Andante Productions
 Soas, Cristina Pato & Rosa Cedron, Fol Music
 Percee, Roberto Alonso Trillo, Ouvirmos
 Clarinet Sonata, Leiva & Amoedo, Ouvirmos
 Prelude and Fugue, Michael Nicolella: Ten Years Passed, Gale Recordings
 'Guernica' Trio, Flatiron Trio, Bohemia Music
 Trio for oboe, bassoon and piano'', Poulenc Trio, 2016, Delos (Naxos)

Notes
 MundoClasico.com (2007)
 Nazareth College (2014)

References

Fernandez, Rosa Maria. “La composición contemporánea gallega en Estados Unidos. Octavio Vázquez.” Recerca Musicològica, no. 20-21 (2014): 355-374.
Kelly, Justin. “Galician Bagpiper Cristina Pato to Join CSO for U.S. Premiere of ‘Widows of the Living and of the Dead.’” The Chautauquan Daily. Chautauqua Institution, August 8, 2018. https://chqdaily.com/2018/08/galician-bagpiper-cristina-pato-to-join-cso-for-u-s-premiere-of-widows-of-the-living-and-of-the-dead/.							
Pfeil, Luke. “Creation.” American Record Guide 79 no. 6 (2016): 175-176. https://delosmusic.com/american-record-guide-praise-for-octavio-vazquezs-triptych/.
Tremblay, Brenda. “Rochester Composer Pursues ‘Irrational’ Passion for Music.” WXXI-FM. WXXI-FM, January 25, 2018.									 https://www.classical915.org/post/rochester-composer-pursues-irrational-passion-music.
“Trio (2012).” Verdehr. Verdehr Trio, 2013. http://www.verdehr.com/notes-VazquezTrio.pdf.
Vazquez Rodriguez, Octavio. "Hermes: Original Music for Symphony Orchestra." DMA diss., University of Maryland, 2004.

External links
 Octavio Vazquez web site
 Octavio Vazquez profile at the Nazareth College of Rochester

21st-century classical composers
American male classical composers
American classical composers
Musicians from Galicia (Spain)
Spanish classical composers
1972 births
Living people
Peabody Institute alumni
21st-century American composers
People from Santiago de Compostela
21st-century American male musicians
Spanish male musicians